Eifler is a surname. Notable people with the surname include:

 Brian S. Eifler (born 1968), U.S. Army officer
 Carl F. Eifler (1906–2002), American police officer and U.S. Army officer
 Erna Eifler (1908–1944), German resistance member
 Milo Eifler (born 1998), American football player